Daphne Deloren is a meteorologist, working for places like CNN, NBC6, WNEM-TV5, WCTV, and KESQ.  She began working for WSMV's 4WARN Weather team in June 2016.

Education
Deloren graduated from Florida State University in 2014 with a bachelor's degree in meteorology.

References

External links
Official Facebook page

American television meteorologists
Florida State University alumni
Living people
Journalists from California
People from Nashville, Tennessee
Year of birth missing (living people)